The Australia women's national soccer team results for the period 1975 to 1999 inclusive.

Match results

1970s

An Australian representative side participated in the 1975 AFC Women's Championship however these games are not recognised as official Australian international fixtures. The participants were the NSW State Team that the organisers had labelled as Australia. Further to this, matches were only 60 minutes in length.

1980–84

1985–89

1991

1994

1995

1996

1997

1998

1999

See also
 Australia women's national soccer team results (2000–09)
 Australia women's national soccer team results (2010–19)
 Australia women's national soccer team results (2020–29)

External links
 Australian Results

References

1975
1979 in Australian soccer
1980 in Australian soccer
1981 in Australian soccer
1983 in Australian soccer
1984 in Australian soccer
1986 in Australian soccer
1987 in Australian soccer
1988 in Australian soccer
1989 in Australian soccer
1991 in Australian soccer
1993 in Australian soccer
1994 in Australian soccer
1994–95 in Australian women's soccer
1995–96 in Australian women's soccer
1996–97 in Australian women's soccer
1997–98 in Australian women's soccer
1998–99 in Australian women's soccer
1999–2000 in Australian women's soccer